Strange Loyalties is a 1991 crime novel by William McIlvanney.  This book is the third in the series featuring the character Laidlaw. This series of books is recognised as the foundation of the Tartan Noir genre.

Plot
The novel centres around the death of Jack Laidlaw's brother Scott (a teacher) who is run over by a car. Laidlaw is faced with an emotional journey to the depths of Glasgow's underworld and his own past, to discover the truth, finds out as much about himself as his brother.

Style
Unlike the first two novels in this series, Strange Loyalties is written as a first-person narrative.

Editions
The book was first published in 1991 by Hodder & Stoughton, and was reissued on 3 June 2013 by Canongate.

References

Scottish novels
Scottish crime novels
Novels set in Glasgow
British detective novels
1991 British novels
Hodder & Stoughton books
Novels by William McIlvanney